Josua Hoffalt (born May 19, 1984) is a French ballet dancer who is currently a Danseur Étoile (principal dancer) at the Paris Opera Ballet.

He was promoted to Danseur Étoile on March 7, 2012, after dancing la Bayadère by Rudolf Nureyev with Aurélie Dupont at the Opéra Bastille in Paris, France.

He is a founding member of 3e étage, directed by Samuel Murez.

References

 http://www.operadeparis.fr/les-artistes/le-ballet/etoiles
 https://web.archive.org/web/20140808052744/https://www.operadeparis.fr/en/videopera/josua-hoffalt-nomme-danseur-etoile

Paris Opera Ballet étoiles
1984 births
Living people